In the Chicago mayoral election of 1861, Republican Julian Sidney Rumsey defeated People’s nominee Thomas Barbour Bryan by a ten-point margin.

The election took place on April 16, 1861.

The election was the first of four Chicago mayoral elections which took place during the course of the American Civil War.

Campaign
The municipal election season came on the tail of the fall of Fort Sumter. Both parties referred to their tickets as “Union”.

On April 15 the Democrats held a meeting where they urged the election of their ticket to maintain the union.

Both parties adopted strong support for the union and its cause in the war.

Democratic nominee Thomas Barbour Bryan was a Chicago business leader.

Bryan was seen to be a far more prominent figure than Rumsey at the  time of the election. 

Bryan had been drafted for mayor by a number of acquaintances to run on what the being dubbed "The People's Ticket". Unaware at the time that he'd be running in opposition to the Republican Party, Bryan reluctantly accepted. He was reported to, ultimately, have seemed somewhat relieved by his ultimate defeat in the polls. He did not desire to be mayor of the city, nor did he want to cause disarray or fractures in the Republican Party at the time that the civil war was beginning. 

Rumsey was also a largely unwilling candidate, and did not desire to be mayor. 

Republicans primarily took issue not with the Democratic nominee for mayor, who many Republicans saw to be a unionist of strong character, but rather with the overall Democratic ticket for the municipal elections. Many Republicans felt uncomfortable with the fact that the Democratic ticket was strongly supported by the Chicago Times.

Results
Despite the unusual times in which the election was held, much of the city voted along its typical party lines.

References

Mayoral elections in Chicago
Chicago
Chicago
1860s in Chicago